The Cleveland Tigers were a Negro league baseball team in the Negro National League, based in Cleveland, Ohio, in 1928. In their only season, they finished in seventh place with a 20-59 record.

References

African-American history in Cleveland
Negro league baseball teams
Tigers
Defunct baseball teams in Ohio
Baseball teams disestablished in 1928
Baseball teams established in 1928